The 27th World Artistic Gymnastics Championships were held in Paris, France, from 14 to 19 April 1992.

The team and all-around events were not contested at the 1992 Worlds. The format was similar to that of the 2002 Worlds, with medals being awarded for the individual WAG and MAG apparatus. There were three rounds of competition: the preliminary round open to everyone; the semi-finals open to the top sixteen qualifiers; and the finals for the top nine gymnasts.

Medalists

Men

Floor exercise

Pommel horse

Rings

Vault

Parallel bars

Horizontal bar

Women

Vault

Uneven bars

Balance beam

Floor exercise

Medals

Overall

Men

Women

References 

World Artistic Gymnastics Championships
G
W
Gymnastics in Paris
International gymnastics competitions hosted by France